Dillon Phillips (born 11 June 1995) is an English professional footballer who plays as a goalkeeper for KV Oostende on loan from Cardiff City. He had brief loan spells at Whitehawk and Bishop's Stortford, before helping Cheltenham Town to win the National League whilst on a season-long loan during the 2015–16 campaign.

Club career
Phillips signed for the Charlton Athletic academy when he was 8 years old. He signed his first professional forms in the summer of 2013 at the age of 17 and joined Conference South side Whitehawk on a one-month loan on 8 November 2013. He returned to the Conference South on a one-month loan with Bishop's Stortford on 3 January 2015. He joined National League club Cheltenham Town on a six-month loan in July 2015. He started every game for the "Robins", keeping ten clean sheets in 26 games, and had his loan extended until the end of the 2015–16 season. He picked up an injury in March 2016, and missed the end-of-season run-in as Cheltenham secured promotion as National League champions. He signed a new two-year contract with Charlton in May 2016.

On 16 October 2020, Phillips joined Cardiff City for an undisclosed fee.

On 27 July 2022, Phillips joined Belgian First Division A side Oostende on a season-long loan deal.

Career statistics

Honours
Cheltenham Town
National League: 2015–16

Charlton Athletic
EFL League One play-offs: 2019

Individual
Charlton Athletic Player of the Year: 2019–20

References

1995 births
Footballers from Hornchurch
Living people
English footballers
Association football goalkeepers
Charlton Athletic F.C. players
Whitehawk F.C. players
Bishop's Stortford F.C. players
Cheltenham Town F.C. players
Cardiff City F.C. players
National League (English football) players
English Football League players
English expatriate footballers
Expatriate footballers in Belgium
English expatriate sportspeople in Belgium
K.V. Oostende players